The Lexington Ballet Company is a ballet company located in Lexington, Kentucky. The ballet was founded in 1974  by Nels Jorgenson and granted status  as a 501(c)(3) organization in 1975.

Company
Lexington Ballet Company performs in the central Kentucky area. Past performances have included The Nutcracker, Sleeping Beauty, The Tales of Beatrix Potter, The Jungle Book, L'Histoire du soldat, Romeo and Juliet, Cinderella, Alice in Wonderland, Giselle, A Midsummer Night's Dream, Snow White, Coppélia, The Firebird, The Köln Concert, Don Quixote, and Les Sylphides.

Luis Dominguez, the company's artistic director, was born in Mexico City and began his ballet training under two former principals of The National Ballet of Mexico. After coming to the United States, Mr. Dominguez trained at  Dance Theatre of Harlem in New York City and toured with them as a dancer for eighteen years.

Nancy Dominguez, the school director, trained at the Chicago City Ballet, under the direction of Ballerina Maria Tallchief. She danced professionally at State Ballet of Missouri, Atlanta Ballet, Ballet New England, and Dance Theatre of Harlem under Arthur Mitchell.

The company has 8 levels, 1 being the very first level, to 8 being the last level.

Company dancers include Meghana Bendre, Kayleigh Western, Janna Turner, Haley Mauldin, Duncan Gwinn, and Alex Bellocq.

History
Nels Jorgensen established Jorgensen Ballet on 1974 with a grant from the National Endowment for the Arts.
It was granted 501(c)(3) status under the name Lexington Ballet Company, Inc in 1975. 
In 1986 Lexington Ballet Company moved into ArtsPlace at 161 North Mill Street in Lexington, Kentucky. 
Also in 1986  Karl and Colette Kaufman founded the annual Lexington Ballet Summer Intensive program.
In 1987 Lexington Ballet hosted the Southeastern Regional Ballet Association (SERBA) gathering attended by 650 dancers, teachers and choreographers. 
In 1989 Karl Kaufman and Kirt Hathaway establishes the annual Ballet Under the Stars in Lexington, Kentucky.
in 2008 MAD Camp was established as an annual youth Music, Arts, Dance camp.
In 2009 the Educational Outreach program is updated to support dance education in Title I schools funded by a generous grant from W. Paul and Lucille Caudill Little Foundation.

Lexington Ballet performed in the opening ceremony of the FEI World Equestrian Games in Lexington, Kentucky in 2010.
Lexington Ballet was recognized in 2013 with the Salute to Small Business Phoenix Award presented by Commerce Lexington, Inc. In 2020, due to the COVID-19 pandemic, the Lexington ballet did a virtual showing of their yearly Nutcracker performance with covid masks and showed it on Vimeo.

References

External links
 

Ballet companies in the United States
Ballet schools in the United States
Arts organizations based in Kentucky
Non-profit organizations based in Lexington, Kentucky
Culture of Lexington, Kentucky
Education in Lexington, Kentucky
Performing arts in Kentucky
Arts organizations established in 1974
1974 establishments in Kentucky